Andrew S. Currier is an English former professional rugby league and rugby union footballer who played in the 1980s, 1990s and 2000s. A Great Britain national representative goal-kicking , he played most of his club rugby with English club Widnes as well as stints with Featherstone Rovers (Heritage № 711), Warrington Wolves (Heritage № 924) and the Australian team Balmain Tigers. At the time of his retirement, he was co-holder of the Widnes club record for most points in a match, with 34. He played out the last years of his career with English rugby union teams.

Playing career
Son of Harry Currier, who in 1969 founded Widnes-based rugby league club, Halton Simms, Andy Currier began his professional career with Widnes. He later helped them to consecutive championships in 1988 and 1989, and then to victory in the 1989 World Club Challenge. During  the 1988 Great Britain Lions tour he was flown to Australia as a replacement for the injured Garry Schofield.

Currier moved to Australia to play with Sydney club, the Balmain Tigers, and became the NSWRL's top point scorer for the 1989 season. Currier also played in the memorable 1989 Winfield Cup Grand Final loss against Canberra at the end of that season.

Currier played right- and scored a try in Widnes' 24-18 victory over Salford in the 1990 Lancashire Cup Final during the 1990–91 season at Central Park, Wigan on Saturday 29 September 1990.

Currier played right- and scored a conversion in Widnes' 6-12 defeat by Wigan in the 1988–89 John Player Special Trophy Final during the 1988–89 season at Burnden Park, Bolton on Saturday 7 January 1989, and played right- and scored a conversion in the 24-0 victory over Leeds in the 1991–92 Regal Trophy Final during the 1991–92 season at Central Park, Wigan on Saturday 11 January 1992.

At the end of the NSWRL 1990 season Currier returned to England to continue playing for Widnes, helping them to the Challenge Cup Final in 1993. At the end of that season he was purchased by Featherstone Rovers along with two other test players in a bold recruitment drive. He later played for Warrington and South Wales before ending his rugby league career with his original club, Widnes.

Currier also played rugby union for London Welsh and Worcester following his retirement from rugby league.

References

External links
!Great Britain Statistics at englandrl.co.uk (statistics currently missing due to not having appeared for both Great Britain, and England)
(archived by web.archive.org) Andy Currier at stats.rleague.com
(archived by web.archive.org) Andy Currier at nrlstats.com.au

1966 births
Living people
English rugby league players
English rugby union players
Rugby league centres
Widnes Vikings players
Balmain Tigers players
Featherstone Rovers players
Great Britain national rugby league team players
Lancashire rugby league team players
London Welsh RFC players
Rugby league players from Widnes
Rugby union players from Widnes
South Wales RLFC (1995) players
Warrington Wolves players
Worcester Warriors players
Workington Town players